"Heaven Bound (I'm Ready)" is a song written by Dennis Linde and originally recorded by the American country music group The Oak Ridge Boys on their 1991 album Unstoppable. It was released in August 1995 by American country music group Shenandoah as the third single from the album In the Vicinity of the Heart.  Their version of the song reached No. 24 on the Billboard Hot Country Singles & Tracks chart.

Critical reception
Jim Ridley of New Country described the song negatively, saying that it sounded similar to "The Lion Sleeps Tonight". An uncredited review in the Indianapolis Star was more favorable, calling the song "a clever merger of spiritual and country".

Chart performance

References

1995 singles
1991 songs
The Oak Ridge Boys songs
Shenandoah (band) songs
Songs written by Dennis Linde
Song recordings produced by Don Cook
Liberty Records singles